"Since I Had You" is a quiet storm-styled soul song recorded by singer Marvin Gaye for the I Want You album. The song was co-written by Gaye and the album's producer, Leon Ware.

Background 
The song was initially conceived by Ware and lyricist Pam Sawyer with the title, "Long Time No See".

One day, outside Marvin's Room, Gaye told Ware that he liked the melody, but he wanted to rewrite the lyrics. Ware approved Gaye's suggestion and they immediately went back in the studio.

Sawyer arrived when Gaye was halfway through the song and she was not happy with the new lyrics. Sawyer then pulled Ware to the side of the studio and they started to argue about the lyric change. Ware pointed out that it would be hard to convince Gaye to sing the original lyrics because according to Ware, Gaye had a known reputation of leaving the studio if anyone criticized him in the process of recording. Ware then told her, “You’ll have to tell Marvin yourself.” Sawyer left afterward.

As time goes by, Ware and Sawyer reconciled and they came to an understanding.

Overview
Similarly to the song "All the Way Round", "Since I Had You" tells the story of a reunion between the singer and a reputed lover, this time at a dance floor and convincing the woman despite the fact their relationship has cooled into a friendship to make love again. Like Come Live with Me Angel" and "Feel All My Love Inside" before, the song includes sexual moans. 

"Since I Had You" is one of the few songs from the I Want You album that Gaye had performed live. Others include, the title track, "After the Dance", and "All The Way Around".

Personnel
All vocals and keyboards by Marvin Gaye
All other instrumentation by assorted musicians
Produced and written by Leon Ware and Marvin Gaye

References

1976 songs
Marvin Gaye songs
Songs written by Marvin Gaye
Songs written by Leon Ware
Song recordings produced by Marvin Gaye
Soul ballads
1970s ballads